Elma or ELMA may refer to:

Places

United States 
 Elma, Iowa, a city in the US
 Elma, New York, a town in the US
 Elma Center, New York
 Elma, Washington, a city in the US
 Elma Township, Richland County, North Dakota, in Richland County, North Dakota, US
 Elma, Virginia, an unincorporated community in the US
 Elma (hamlet), New York, a hamlet in the US

Elsewhere
 Elma, Manitoba, a community in Canada
 Elma railway station
 Elma (river), a river of Poland

People

Given name
 Elma G. Albert, Justice of the Iowa Supreme Court
 Elma Bellini (1954–2018), New York Supreme Court Justice
 Elma Campbell (1901–1983), Scottish nationalist activist
 Elma Danielsson (1865–1936), Swedish politician
 Elma Tryphosa Dangerfield (1907–2006), British journalist and Liberal Party politician
 Elma Davis (born 1968), South African international lawn bowler
 Elma de Vries (born 1983), Dutch speed skater
 Elma Dienda (born 1964), Namibian politician
 Elma Salinas Ender (born 1953), Texan judge
 Elma Francois (1897–1944), Trinidadian political activist
Elma González (born 1942), Mexican-American biologist
 Elma Gove (1832–1921), American painter
 Elma van Haren (born 1954), Dutch poet
 Elma Karlowa (1932–1994), Yugoslav actress
 Elma Lewis (1921–2004), American arts educator
 Elma Maua (1948–2010), New Zealand journalist
 Elma Miller (born 1954), Canadian musician, composer, writer and educator
 Elma Mitchell (1919–2000), British poet
 Elma Muros (born 1967), Filipina track and field athlete
 Elma Napier (1892–1973), Dominican writer and politician
 Elma Sandford-Morgan (1890–1983), Australian physician
 Elma Sinanović (born 1974), Serbian Bosniak singer
 Elma Soiron (1918–2016), English actress
 Elma Steck (1923–2014), American professional baseball player
 Elma Ström (1822–1889), Swedish opera singer
 Elma Stuckey (1907–1988), African-American poet
 Elma Yerburgh (1864–1946), owner and chairman of the Thwaites Brewery company
 Elma Mary Williams (1913–1971), British author

Surname
 Fikri Elma (died 1999), Turkish footballer
 Ouidad Elma, French-Moroccan actress
  (born 1996), Turkish female water polo player

Fictional characters 
 Elma Leivonen, a fictional character from the anime/manga series Strike Witches
Elma, a fictional character from the video game Xenoblade Chronicles X
Elma, a fictional character from the anime/manga series Miss Kobayashi's Dragon Maid
Elma York, a fictional character from the science fiction novel The Calculating Stars
Elma Radnor, a fictional character from the 1987 movie Matewan

Companies
 Elma Electronic, a Swiss electronics company 
 Empresa Líneas Marítimas Argentinas, a defunct Argentine cargo shipping line
 European Languages and Movies in America

Other uses 
 Elma (gastropod), genus of land snails in the family Streptaxidae
 Elasto Mania, a 2000 2D motorcycle PC-game
 European land mammal age, former name of the European Land Mammal Mega Zone

hu:Elma